Västerås Central Hospital (Swedish: Västmanlands sjukhus Västerås  or Västerås Centrallasarett) in Västerås is the county hospital of Västmanland County in Sweden. It has about 3,000 employees.

References

External links
Västmanlands sjukhus Västerås 

Hospitals in Sweden